The 2015 FC Kaisar season is the club's fifth season back in the Kazakhstan Premier League, the highest tier of association football in Kazakhstan, and 20th in total. Kaisar will also take part in the Kazakhstan Cup.

In July Dmitriy Ogai resigned, with Fyodor Shcherbachenko appointed as his successor on 6 August.

Squad

Transfers

Winter

In:

Out:

Summer

In:

Out:

Competitions

Kazakhstan Premier League

First round

Results summary

Results by round

Results

League table

Relegation Round

Results summary

Results by round

Results

League table

Kazakhstan Cup

Squad statistics

Appearances and goals

|-
|colspan="14"|Players away from Kaisar on loan:
|-
|colspan="14"|Players who appeared for Kaisar that left during the season:

|}

Goal scorers

Disciplinary record

References

FC Kaisar seasons
Kaisar